Dieter Ferner (born 16 January 1949) is a German former football player and manager who played as a goalkeeper.

External links
 NASL/MISL stats

References

1949 births
Living people
German footballers
Association football goalkeepers
North American Soccer League (1968–1984) indoor players
North American Soccer League (1968–1984) players
Major Indoor Soccer League (1978–1992) players
Bayer 04 Leverkusen players
Rot-Weiß Oberhausen players
1. FC Saarbrücken players
1. FC Bocholt players
Chicago Sting (NASL) players
Chicago Sting (MISL) players
Bundesliga players
2. Bundesliga players
German football managers
1. FC Saarbrücken managers
Borussia Neunkirchen managers
German expatriate footballers
German expatriate sportspeople in the United States
Expatriate soccer players in the United States
Sportspeople from Wuppertal
Footballers from North Rhine-Westphalia